Montezumina is a genus of phaneropterine katydids in the family Tettigoniidae. There are at least 30 described species in Montezumina.

Species
These 30 species belong to the genus Montezumina:

 Montezumina azteca Nickle, 1984
 Montezumina bidentata Nickle, 1984
 Montezumina bradleyi Hebard, 1927
 Montezumina bruneri Cadena-Castañeda, 2015
 Montezumina cantralli Nickle, 1984
 Montezumina cohnorum Nickle, 1984
 Montezumina enigmata Nickle, 1984
 Montezumina granti Nickle, 1966
 Montezumina guyana Nickle, 1984
 Montezumina hubbelli Nickle, 1984
 Montezumina inca Nickle, 1984
 Montezumina intermedia Nickle, 1984
 Montezumina lamicerca Nickle, 1984
 Montezumina latipennis (Saussure & Pictet, 1897)
 Montezumina lineata Cadena-Castañeda, 2015
 Montezumina longistyle Márquez Mayaudón, 1965
 Montezumina maculata Nickle, 1984
 Montezumina maya Nickle, 2001
 Montezumina mesembrina Hebard, 1927
 Montezumina modesta (Brunner, 1878) (modest katydid)
 Montezumina oaxaca Nickle, 1984
 Montezumina oblongooculata (Brunner von Wattenwyl, 1878)
 Montezumina obtusangulata Nickle, 1984
 Montezumina oridiopita Nickle, 1984
 Montezumina oridiops (Saussure & Pictet, 1898)
 Montezumina quadripunctata Cadena-Castañeda, 2015
 Montezumina sinaloae Hebard, 1925
 Montezumina unguicerca Nickle, 1984
 Montezumina walkeri Nickle, 1984
 Montezumina zebrata (Bruner, 1915)

References

Further reading

 

Phaneropterinae
Articles created by Qbugbot